Census Division No. 12 (Beausejour Area) is a census division located within the Eastman Region of the province of Manitoba, Canada. Unlike in some other provinces, census divisions do not reflect the organization of local government in Manitoba. These areas exist solely for the purposes of statistical analysis and presentation; they have no government of their own.

The economy of the area consists of agriculture and livestock. The area's population as of the 2006 census was 19,753.

Demographics 

Towns
 Beausejour

Municipalities

 Brokenhead
 Springfield

References

External links
 Manitoba Community Profiles: Beausejour Area

12